Zsuzsanna Szőcs (born 10 April 1962) is a Hungarian fencer, who won two Olympic medals in the foil team competitions. Among her trainers was her father, Bertalan Szőcs.

She won the World Championship four times in 1987, 1989, 1991 and 1992.

References

1962 births
Living people
Fencers at the 1980 Summer Olympics
Fencers at the 1988 Summer Olympics
Hungarian female foil fencers
Olympic bronze medalists for Hungary
Olympic fencers of Hungary
Olympic medalists in fencing
Fencers from Budapest
Medalists at the 1980 Summer Olympics
Medalists at the 1988 Summer Olympics
20th-century Hungarian women